David William Thursfield (born 10 October 1945) is a British businessman, and a former chief executive at Ford; he was also jailed.

Early life
He studied at Aston University, graduating in Production Engineering in 1965. Three years later he gained a BSc degree in Industrial Psychology in 1968.

Career

BL
He was a factory manager for BL.

Ford
He moved to Ford Australia in 1979 as factory manager. From 1984 to 1992 he moved to Europe, where he was head of manufacturing for the European factories. In 1996 he moved to America, becoming head of manufacturing for the plants in Australia and the USA.

At Ford he was nicknamed Darth Vader, due to his reputation for cost-cutting, and his abrasive uncompromising take-no-prisoners personality. At Ford he earned £1.2m a year. He oversaw the end of car production by Ford in the UK, when production of the Ford Fiesta ended in early 2002. From 2000 to 2004 he was Chairman of Ford in Europe, also becoming chief executive.

In 2001 he became head of the international operations of Ford.

He retired from Ford in May 2004.

Personal life
He was married to his second wife Linda for 27 years, a dental surgeon, having a daughter, divorcing on 16 April 2005. He married Rachel, his third wife in 2005.

Prison sentence
When aged 67, he was sentenced to two years in his absence to prison in November 2012 for hiding his money from his divorced second wife Linda, aged 61 in the Thursfield v Thursfield (2012) case. The case was held at the High Court of Justice (EWHC).

References

1945 births
Alumni of Aston University
British Leyland people
British white-collar criminals
Divorce law in the United Kingdom
Ford executives
Ford of Europe
British manufacturing chief executives
Living people